Big Thing(s) may refer to:

Music
 Big Thing (Duran Duran album), 1988
 Big Thing (Blue Zone album), 1988
 "Big Thing" (song), a song by Blue Zone
Big Things (album), 2002 album by P-Money
Big Thangs, 1997 compilation album by Ant Banks
Big Tings, 2018 album by Skindred

Other uses
 Big Thing (TV series), a 2010 South Korean television drama
 Big Things, a sculpture exhibition series at the Royal Alberta Museum, Edmonton, Alberta, Canada
 Australia's big things, large sculptures and novelty architecture used as tourist traps in Australia
List of New Zealand's big things, novelty architecture in New Zealand

See also
 The Next Big Thing (disambiguation)